Kramolin Cove is the  wide cove indenting for  the southwest coast of Greenwich Island in the South Shetland Islands, Antarctica. It is entered between Yovkov Point and Kaspichan Point. Shape enhanced as a result of Murgash Glacier’s retreat in the late 20th and early 21st century. Bulgarian topographic survey Tangra 2004/05. The area was visited by early 19th century sealers.

The cove is named after the settlement of Kramolin in northern Bulgaria.

Location
Bulgarian mapping in 2009.

Map
 L.L. Ivanov. Antarctica: Livingston Island and Greenwich, Robert, Snow and Smith Islands. Scale 1:120000 topographic map. Troyan: Manfred Wörner Foundation, 2009.

Notes

References
 Bulgarian Antarctic Gazetteer. Antarctic Place-names Commission. (details in Bulgarian, basic data in English)
 Kramolin Cove. SCAR Composite Antarctic Gazetteer

External links
 Kramolin Cove. Copernix satellite image

Coves of Greenwich Island
Bulgaria and the Antarctic